This is a listing of places in Cardiff, county and capital city of Wales.

Administrative divisions

Electoral wards
This is a list of electoral wards covered by Cardiff Council:

Communities

City Centre

The city centre is Cardiff's main shopping area, the sixth largest in the UK. It is also the location of historical and cultural attractions such as:

Civic Centre

The Civic Centre is built from white Portland stone, and location of much of:
Cardiff University
National Museum and Gallery of Wales
Cardiff City Hall
Crown Buildings
Cardiff Crown Court
Temple of Peace

Cardiff Bay

Formerly called Tiger Bay, this was where the world's first million-pound cheque was signed and was the centre of the global coal industry in the 19th and 20th centuries. In the 1980s the Cardiff Bay Development Corporation was set up to redevelop the area and has since been transformed into a high-profile area of living, shopping, dining and culture attractions, such as:

Red Dragon Centre
Mermaid Quay
Wales Millennium Centre
Senedd
Techniquest
The Coal Exchange
St David's Hotel & Spa
Cardiff Bay Wetlands Reserve

Cardiff International Sports Village 

The International Sports Village is a work in progress in Cardiff, with additional sporting and retail sites being added every so often.

Cardiff International Pool
Cardiff International White Water
Cardiff Arena
Ice Arena Wales

Buildings

Covered markets and shopping centres

Leisure centres

Public libraries

Police stations
Cardiff Bay (area headquarters)
Cardiff Central

Historical

Communities that no longer exist
Crockherbtown
Newtown
Temperance Town
Tredegarville

Notable buildings that no longer exist

Geographical

Rivers and waterways
 Rivers
River Taff
River Ely
Rhymney River
 Canals
Dock Feeder Canal
Glamorganshire Canal
Melingriffith Feeder Canal (Whitchurch)
 Weirs
Blackweir
Llandaff weir
Radyr Weir
 Lakes and reservoirs
Roath Park Lake
Llanishen Reservoir
Pentwyn Lake

Woods
Plymouth woods
Leckwith woods
Long Wood (Forest farm)

Educational establishments

Higher Education
Cardiff University
Cardiff Metropolitan University (formerly UWIC)
University of South Wales (formerly University of Glamorgan and University of Wales, Newport)
Royal Welsh College of Music & Drama
St. Michael's College, Llandaff (theological college)

Further Education
Cardiff and Vale College
St David's Catholic College
Cardiff Sixth Form College

Primary and Secondary Education

 Adamsdown
Adamsdown Primary School
Stacey Primary School
Tredegarville Primary School

 Birchgrove
Birchgrove Primary School

 Butetown
Mount Stuart Primary School
St Cuthbert's Roman Catholic Primary School
St Mary The Virgin Church in Wales Primary School
Ysgol Gynradd Gymraeg Hamadryad

 Caerau
Glyn Derw High School
Woodlands High School
Riverbank School
Millbank Primary School
Trelai Primary School
Caerau Infant School
Cwrt-Yr-Ala Junior School

 Canton
Fitzalan High School
Lansdowne Primary School
Radnor Primary School
Ysgol Gymraeg Pwll Coch
Ysgol Gymraeg Treganna
Severn Infant School
Severn Junior School

 Cathays
Cathays High School
Gladstone Primary School
Cardiff Muslim Primary School
St Monica's Church in Wales Primary School

 Coryton
Coryton Primary School

 Creigiau
Cregiau Primary School

 Cyncoed
Cardiff High School
Lakeside Primary School
Rhydypenau Primary School

 Ely
Michaelston Community College (Formerly Glan Ely High School)
Herbert Thompson Primary School
St Fagan's Church in Wales Primary School
St Francis Roman Catholic Primary School
Hywel Dda Infant School
Hywel Dda Junior School
Windsor Clive Infant School
Windsor Clive Junior School

 Fairwater
Bishop Hannon High School (closed 1987)
Cantonian High School
Bishop of Llandaff Church in Wales High School
Ysgol Gyfun Gymraeg Plasmawr
Fairwater Primary School
Holy Family Roman Catholic Primary School
Pentrebane Primary School
Peter Lea Primary School
Ysgol Gymraeg Coed-Y-Gof

 GabalfaAllensbank Primary School
Gabalfa Primary School
Ysgol Mynydd Bychan
St Joseph's Roman Catholic Primary School
St Monica's Church in Wales Primary School

 GrangetownGrangetown Primary School
Ninian Park Primary School
St Patrick's Roman Catholic Primary School
St Paul's Church in Wales Primary School

 HeathTon-Yr-Ywen Primary School

 LisvaneCorpus Christi Roman Catholic High School
Llysfaen Primary School

 LlandaffThe Cathedral School, Llandaff
Howell's School, Llandaff
Bishop of Llandaff Church in Wales High School
Llandaff Church in Wales Primary School
Ysgol Pencae
Danescourt Infant School
Danescourt Junior School

 Llandaff NorthYsgol Gyfun Gymraeg Glantaf
Meadowbank School
Hawthorn Infant School
Hawthorn Junior School

 LlanedeyrnLlanedeyrn High School
Llanedeyrn Primary School

 LlanishenLlanishen High School
Cefn Onn Primary School
Christ the King Roman Catholic Primary School
Coed Glas Primary School
Ysgol Y Wern
The Court School

 LlanrumneyLlanrumney High School
Bryn Hafod Primary School
Glan-yr-Afon Primary School
Pen-y-Bryn Primary School
St Cadoc's Roman Catholic Primary School
St Mellon's Church in Wales Primary School
Ysgol Bro Eirwg

 PentwynAll Saints Primary School
Bryn Celyn Primary School
The Hollies School
Springwood Primary School
St Bernadette's Roman Catholic Primary School
St David's Church in Wales Primary School
St Peter Evan's Roman Catholic Primary School
Ysgol Y Berllan Deg
Glyncoed Infant & Nursery School
Glyncoed Junior School
St Philip Evans Roman Catholic Primary School

 PentyrchPentyrch Primary School
Ysgol Gynradd Gwaelod Y Garth Primary School

 PenylanSt Teilo's Church in Wales High School
Ysgol Gyfun Gymraeg Bro Edern
Ty Gwyn School
Marlborough Infant School
Marlborough Junior School

 PontprennauPontprennau Primary School

 Radyr & MorganstownRadyr Comprehensive School
Bryn Deri Primary School
Radyr Primary School

 RhiwbinaGreenhill School
Llanishen Fach Primary School
Rhiwbeina Primary School
Greenhill School

 RiversideKitchener Primary School
St Mary's Catholic Primary School

 RoathAlbany Primary School
St Peter's Roman Catholic Primary School
Taibah Muslim Primary School
St Anne's Church in Wales Infant School

 RumneyEastern High School, Cardiff
St Illtyd's Catholic High School
Greenway Primary School
Rumney Primary School

 SplottBaden Powell Primary School
Moorland Primary School
St Alban's Roman Catholic Primary School
Ysgol Glan Morfa

 ThornhillThornhill Primary School

 TongwynlaisTongwynlais Primary School

 TremorfaWillows High School

 TrowbridgeBishop Childs Church in Wales Primary School
Meadowlane Primary School
Oakfield Primary School
St John Lloyd Roman Catholic Primary School
Willowbrook Primary School
Trowbridge Primary School

 Whitchurch'''
Whitchurch High School
Eglwys Newydd Primary School
Eglwys Wen Primary School
Ysgol Gymraeg Melin Gruffydd

Parks

Archaeological sites
Cardiff Castle
Castell Coch
 Morganstown Castle Mound
 Twmpath Castle
 The Priory (Bute park)
 The Friary (foundations removed to build the Capital Tower)

Retail parks

Transport

Public transport hubs
Cardiff Central railway station
Cardiff Queen Street railway station
Radyr railway station
Dumfries Place (bus interchange)
Greyfriars Road (bus interchange)

Major roads

A4055 road
A4232 road
A470 road
A48 road
A4161 road
A48(M) motorway
Cowbridge Road East/West
M4 motorway
Newport Road

Railway lines

Railway stations

Cycle routes
Taff Trail
Ely Trail
Rhymney Trail
Lôn Las Cymru (National Cycle Network: Route 8)
National Cycle Network: Route 88

Walking routes
Cardiff Centenary Walk

Bridges

Shipping
Cardiff Bay (leisure boats and local ferries)
Penarth Marina

Airports
 Cardiff Heliport

(Cardiff International Airport and the military base RAF St Athan are both located in the neighbouring Vale of Glamorgan)

See also
List of cultural venues in Cardiff
List of places in Wales

References

Places
Cardiff